"My Last Chance" is a song by American recording artist Marvin Gaye. Gaye originally recorded this song as a demo during the making of the What's Going On period, initially as an instrumental. Two years later, he added vocals. Eventually he revised the song, along with Anna Gordy Gaye, his wife, and collaborator Elgie Stover as "I Love You Secretly" for The Miracles on their 1973 album, Renaissance.

In 1990 Motown remixed the track in a modern R&B-styled quiet storm production and issued it on R&B radio stations that year. The song gave Gaye his first charted Billboard single as a posthumous artist in five years, eventually peaking at number 16 on the Hot R&B Singles & Tracks chart.

In 2001, the 1972 version was finally released on the compilation, 20th Century Masters - The Millennium Collection: The Very Best of Marvin Gaye, Vol. 2: The 1970s.

A remix of the song was included on the 2019 posthumous album, You're the Man.

Personnel
All vocals by Marvin Gaye. Background vocals were added for the 1990 remix by The Waters
Original instrumentation by The Funk Brothers; The Funk Brothers do not appear on the remixed versions. 
The 1990 remix was produced by Steve Lindsey and Zack Vaz.  
The 2019 remix was produced by Salaam Remi
Source: https://www.discogs.com/Marvin-Gaye-My-Last-Chance/master/220474

1972 songs
1990 singles
Marvin Gaye songs
Songs written by Marvin Gaye
Song recordings produced by Marvin Gaye
Tamla Records singles